Katz's Deli is a Jewish deli and restaurant with multiple locations in Houston, in the U.S. state of Texas.

History
The original restaurant opened along Westheimer in 1998. A second location opened in The Woodlands in 2007. A third location opened in the Heights in 2020.

See also
 List of Ashkenazi Jewish restaurants
 History of the Jews in Houston

References

External links

 
 Katz's Deli and Bar at Houston Press
 Katz's Deli at Zagat
 Katz's Deli & Bar at Zomato

1998 establishments in Texas
Ashkenazi Jewish culture in Texas
Ashkenazi Jewish restaurants
Jewish delicatessens in the United States
Jews and Judaism in Houston
Neartown, Houston
Restaurants in Houston
Restaurants established in 1998